The Finance Act 2005 (c 7) is an Act of the Parliament of the United Kingdom.

Provisions

Section 1 - Rates of tobacco products duty
Section 1(1) substitutes the Table of rates of duty in Schedule 1 to the Tobacco Products Duty Act 1979.

Section 8 - Charge and rates for 2005-06
This section was repealed by section 1031 of, and Part 1 of Schedule 3 to, the Income Tax Act 2007.

Section 9 - Personal allowances for those aged 65 or more
This section was repealed by section 1031 of, and Part 1 of Schedule 3 to, the Income Tax Act 2007.

Section 14 - Special trust rates not to apply to first slice of trust income
This section was repealed by section 1031 of, and Part 1 of Schedule 3 to, the Income Tax Act 2007.

Section 41 - Interpretation etc
Paragraph (a) of the definition of "tax year" in section 41(1), with the following "and", was repealed by section 1031 of, and Part 1 of Schedule 3 to, the Income Tax Act 2007.

Section 44 - Consequential amendments
Section 44(1) was repealed by section 1031 of, and Part 1 of Schedule 3 to, the Income Tax Act 2007.

References

External links
The Finance Act 2005, as amended from the National Archives.
The Finance Act 2005, as originally enacted from the National Archives.
Explanatory notes to the Finance Act 2005.

United Kingdom Acts of Parliament 2005
Tax legislation in the United Kingdom